The cryptic skink  (Oligosoma inconspicuum) is a nationally vulnerable species of skink native to New Zealand.

Conservation status 

As of 2012 the Department of Conservation (DOC) classified the cryptic skink as At Risk under the New Zealand Threat Classification System. It was judged as meeting the criteria for At Risk threat status as a result of it having a low to high ongoing or predicted decline.

References

External links 

 Holotype specimen of Oligosoma inconspicuum held at the Museum of New Zealand Te Papa Tongarewa

Oligosoma
Endemic fauna of New Zealand
Reptiles of New Zealand
Reptiles described in 1990
Taxa named by Geoff B. Patterson
Taxa named by Charles H. Daugherty